Lallu is an Indian actor and lyricist who works in Tamil-language films. He is known for his role in Rangoon (2017).

Career 
Lallu started his career as an actor by acting in several short films. He debuted as a lyricist for Inga Enna Solluthu (2014) and wrote a song for Virattu (2014). In a soundtrack album review of Inga Enna Solluthu, the reviewer wrote that "‘Cute-ana’ sung by Naresh Iyer and written by Lallu, is enjoyable". That same year, he received a role in R. Parthiban's Kathai Thiraikathai Vasanam Iyakkam (2014) after Keerthana, Parthiban's daughter, watched one of his short films and suggested him for a role. He played supporting roles in Chennai 600028 II (2016) and 8 Thottakkal (2017) before he starred in Rangoon (2017). He garnered acclaim for playing one of Gautham Karthik's friends in the film. Lallu had also written a song titled "Foreign Return" for the film that contained Burmese lyrics. He has since played supporting roles in several films including Sarkar (2018) and Kaithi (2019).

Filmography 
All films are in Tamil, unless otherwise noted.

As actor 
 Films

Web series
Vella Raja (2018) as Aadira's assistant
Mitta (2019)
Dhunki (2019)

As lyricist

References

External links 
 

Actors in Tamil cinema
Indian lyricists
Living people
Year of birth missing (living people)